Amelia Moore (born February 4, 1990) is an American amateur boxer and member of USA Boxing. Born in 1990 in Middletown, Connecticut, she grew up in the Oxford Hills region of Western Maine where she began practicing martial arts at age seven. Moore became emancipated at age 16 and graduated from Oxford Hills Comprehensive High School in 2008. She began training as a boxer while she was still in high school, continuing with an off-campus regimen during her two years at the United States Naval Academy. Moore began fighting for USA Boxing in 2011 and has won two national championships. She lives in Colorado Springs, Colorado and competes around the world.

Early life

Moore was born on 4 February 1990 in Middletown, Connecticut. When she was four, her family moved to Norway, Maine where she attended Guy E. Rowe Elementary School. At age seven, Moore participated in a visiting karate program at the school and began studying competition sparring and kata, which she credits with "igniting a fire" in her for combat sport. Moore played football in middle school and participated in soccer, hockey and track and field at Oxford Hills Comprehensive High School.

Moore became emancipated at age 16 and began working two jobs to support living on her own. By the end of her junior year in high school, her financial situation caused her to consider enlisting in the military rather than attending a four-year college. Her high school counselor encouraged her to look into the United States military academies. After studying information her counselor provided and viewing the 2006 film Annapolis, Moore became especially interested in the United States Naval Academy. The school recruited her to run track.

After her 2008 graduation from high school and a year of Navy preparatory school, Moore entered the United States Naval Academy. She took training classes in swimming, wrestling and boxing and remained at the school for two years before being medically discharged due to a diagnosis of Crohn's disease.

Boxing career
Moore first became interested in boxing in 2006 when she attended a self-defense kickboxing class in Portland, Maine. The instructor, who ran a boxing gym, approached her at the conclusion of the class to ask about Moore's athletic background. Moore was unable to afford the commute to train at the time, but began researching boxing and its training requirements.  By the end of junior year, however, she had secured a vehicle and was able to travel to train with Joey Gamache at his gym in Lewiston, Maine.

Unable to receive training at the Naval Academy, Moore found a coach in nearby Millersville, Maryland. When her school obligations were complete, she would run over a mile to her vehicle, which she was not allowed to have as a first-year student, and drive the 20 minutes to train. Moore competed in her first USA Boxing fight on 5 February 2011, the day after her 21st birthday.

In 2016 at age 27, Moore won the 2017 National Golden Gloves Championship in women's 141-lb weight class. She won gold medals at the Elite National Championships and National PAL that same year, and in 2018 was a top finisher in the European Boxing Confederation's International Boxing Tournament, or "Boxam." Moore won her second national title in December 2021 at the USA Boxing National Championships and won a bronze medal in 2022 the Continental Championships in Guayaquil, Ecuador.

Olympic runs

In 2015, after completing only 14 official fights, Moore made the 2016 Summer Olympics qualifying tournament but had to withdraw before it began due to illness. In 2020, she was an alternate for Tokyo team member Rashida Ellis, but was unable to travel to the games because of COVID-19 restrictions.

Personal life
Moore lives in Colorado Springs, Colorado and works as an accountant in healthcare.
She enjoys gardening, cooking, paddle boarding, and guitar, and she rides a motorcycle.

References

External links
Amelia Moore on Instagram
USA Boxing elite women's rankings

American women boxers
1990 births
People from Connecticut
Living people